Frans Viktor Heikel (23 August 1842 – 27 July 1927) was a Finland-Swedish gymnastics teacher, known as "the father of Finnish school gymnastics".

Life 
Heikel was born in Turku to educator and priest Henrik Heikel and Wilhelmina Johanna Schauman. He had ten siblings, including brother Felix Heikel (1844–1921), a bank manager and politician and sister Anna Heikel, head of the School for the Deaf. In 1873 Heikel married Hanna Kihlman. He was father to doctor Allan Phayllos Heikel (born 1885) and ethnologist Yngvar Heikel (born 1889). He was also cousin to ethnographer Axel Heikel and philologist Ivar Heikel. 

Between 1867 and 1869 Heikel studied gymnastics in Stockholm and Germany. In 1869 he became a teacher of gymnastics at the Svenska normallyceum i Helsingfors (Swedish Normal School in Helsinki), and in 1873 a lecturer in gymnastics at the Nykarleby Seminary. From 1876 to 1911 he was senior lecturer in gymnastics at the University of Helsinki. He was awarded the title of professor in 1907 and was promoted to honorary doctor of medicine in 1919. Heikel helped found and taught at the Nya svenska samskolan, a private co-educational school in Helsinki, in 1888.

He developed a system based on Swedish and German gymnastics that reformed Finnish gymnastics. He was also interested in swimming, rowing and athletics. He was opposed to modern sports with its specialization, competitiveness and pursuit of records, while Artur Eklund, in a polemic with Heikel, expressed himself pejoratively about gymnastics.

Heikel participated extensively in the cultural and social endeavours of the time. In the 1860s, together with his sister Anna Heikel, he helped introduce the Baptist church to Finland. Critical of the Evangelical Lutheran Church of Finland, he supported the foundation of the Association for Religious Freedom and Tolerance in Finland in 1887; he was also involved in the Prometheus student society which campaigned for freedom of religion.

Heikel died 27 July 1927 in Porvoon maalaiskunta, Finland.

Works

In Swedish 

 . Helsinki 1888.
 . Helsinki 1888.
 . Second revised edition, Holm, Helsinki 1889.
 . Helsinki 1891.
 . Helsinki 1892.
 . Helsinki 1893.
 . Helsinki 1894.
 . Notes by E. Cannelin. Helsinki 1895.
 . Helsinki 1895.
 . Helsinki 1898.
 . Helsinki 1900.
 . Helsinki 1903.
 . Helsinki 1904, second revised and extended edition, Söderström, Helsinki 1915.
 . Helsinki 1904.
 . Helsinki 1904.
 . Helsinki 1905.
 . Helsinki 1906.
 . Helsinki 1907.
 Leading Principles of Schoolgymnastics. Helsinki 1908.
 . Helsinki 1909.
 . Helsinki 1912.
 . Porvoo 1925.

In Finnish 

 . WSOY 1891.
 . Helsinki 1902.
 . Helsinki 1905.
 . The second Swedish edition was translated by K. E. Levälahti with the author's permission. Karisto 1909, 2nd revised edition 1912.
 . From the second revised and expanded edition by Uuno Suomela. WSOY 1916.

References

External links 

 Heikel, 3. Frans Viktor in the Nordisk familjebok (second edition, 1909) 
 Heikel, Viktor in Biografiskt lexikon för Finland 
 Heikel, Viktor in Uppslagsverket Finland (web edition, 2012). CC-BY-SA 4.0 

1842 births
1927 deaths
People from Turku
Swedish-speaking Finns
Finnish Baptists
Converts to Baptist denominations
Academic staff of the University of Helsinki
Finnish people in sports
History of gymnastics
19th-century Finnish people
20th-century Finnish people